The Kaxabu people are a variant of the Pazeh/Kaxabu ethno-linguistic group of Taiwanese Aborigines.

See also
 Kingdom of Middag
 Formosan languages
 Taiwanese indigenous peoples

Taiwanese indigenous peoples